Bacent Osman (born 23 August 1977) is an Egyptian table tennis player. Her highest career ITTF ranking was 256. She participated in the 2005 and 2007 World Table Tennis Championships.

References

1977 births
Living people
Egyptian female table tennis players